Adolph Bradley Hollingsworth (January 11, 1899 – January 5, 1961) was an American college football coach. He served as the head football coach at Union University in Jackson, Tennessee from 1931 to 1936. He hired Bear Bryant as an assistant in 1936.

A native of Mount Andrew in Barbour County, Alabama, Hollingsworth graduated from the University of Alabama with a Bachelor of Science degree in 1921. He served as the head football at Eufaula High School in Eufaula, Alabama from 1921 to 1922. In 1926, Hollingworth began coaching at Bethel College in Russellville, Kentucky. He resigned from his post at Bethel in the summer of 1930 to become an assistant coach at Union University. 

Hollingsworth married Mae Ella Munn of Ozark, Alabama on July 21, 1922. He later lived in Montgomery, Alabama and Birmingham, Alabama and worked as a district manager for the Orkin Exterminating Company. Hollingsworth died on January 5, 1961, in Birmingham.

Head coaching record

College football

References

External links
 

1899 births
1961 deaths
Bethel Warriors football coaches
Union Bulldogs football coaches
High school football coaches in Alabama
University of Alabama alumni
People from Barbour County, Alabama
Coaches of American football from Alabama